Spiophanicola is a genus of cyclopoid copepods in the family Spiophanicolidae, the sole genus of the family. There are at least two described species in Spiophanicola.

Species
These two species belong to the genus Spiophanicola:
 Spiophanicola atlanticus Kim I.H., Sikorski, O'Reilly & Boxshall, 2013
 Spiophanicola spinosus Ho, 1984

References

Cyclopoida
Monotypic crustacean genera